Troy Hills is a census-designated place (CDP) in the township of Parsippany-Troy Hills, Morris County, New Jersey, United States. It is in the southeast part of the township, bordered to the north and west by the Parsippany CDP, to the south by Whippany in Hanover Township, and to the east by Troy Meadows, the largest freshwater marsh in New Jersey.

Interstate 80 forms the northern edge of the CDP, and Jefferson Road is the western edge.

The community was first listed as a CDP prior to the 2020 census.

Demographics

References 

Census-designated places in Morris County, New Jersey
Census-designated places in New Jersey
Parsippany-Troy Hills, New Jersey